Radwan (Radowan) (died 1172) was a bishop of Poznań. 

Nothing is known about his origin and family. He was a chancellor of duke Mieszko III Stary (mentioned in 1152/1153) and later, probably in 1164, became a bishop of Poznań. His promotion was a basic argument for Tadeusz Wojciechowski's hypothesis about a special connection between the chancellor office and Poznań's bishopric.

Name and origin 
His name in Latin was written as Radovanus.

Most Polish historians used Radwan as a Polish version of his name. Historian Tomasz Jurek considered the version Radowan as a proper one.

According to Jan Długosz, a chronicler living in 15th century, Radwan was member of the Śreniawitas (Śreniawici) family, but modern historians considered this information as erroneous. Historian Józef Nowacki supposed that Radwan was member of the Radwan family.

Chancellor 
Radwan was a chancellor of Mieszko III the Old, duke of Greater Poland. As a chancellor he is mentioned in the foundation charter for the Cistercian monastery in Łekno. The charter was issued in 1153. According to Cistercians' tradition the start of a new year was Lady Day (25 March), so the charter could be issued between 25 March 1152 and 24 March 1153.

Later Radwan became a bishop of Poznań. His promotion was a basic argument for Tadeusz Wojciechowski's hypothesis about a special connection between the chancellor office and Poznań's bishopric. Radwan's career looks similar to other bishops of Poznań who earlier were Mieszko's chancellors, like his predecessor Pean and successor Cherubin.

Bishop of Poznań 
There is a dispute among historians about dates when Radwan was a bishop of Poznań. According to chronicler Jan Długosz Radwan was bishop from 1156 to 1162, but in other place he mentioned that he was a bishop on 6 May 1170. The first information is considered as untrue, while the second was based on earlier sources.

According to the Rocznik Lubiński (Lubin's Yearbook) Radwan was a successor of Cherubin, who died in 1172. This information is false as Cherubin was a bishop of Poznań during a synod in Łęczyca in 1180. Historian Władysław Semkowicz supposed there is a mistake in sequence of bishops in Rocznik Lubiński and Radwan should be placed before Cherubin. This thesis is widely accepted by scholars. According to most historians Radwan was a bishop from 1164 to 1172.

On May 6, 1170 Mieszko III Stary and Radwan founded a hospice at the Church of Saint Michael the Archangel in Poznan, which in 1187 was given to the Knights of Saint John. This foundation is mentioned in the document of his successor Benedict (c. 1192) and Jan Długosz in his Annals.

Footnotes

References

Primary sources

Secondary sources

1172 deaths
12th-century Roman Catholic bishops in Poland
Bishops of Poznań